

Men's events

Medal table 

1975
1975 Pan American Games